The following is a list of people from Mansfield, Ohio. These people were born, lived, or worked in and around the city.

Architecture
Paul Gilger, architect, set designer and playwright
F.F. Schnitzer, architect with many structures on the National Register of Historic Places. Principal architect and superintendent of construction for the Old Ohio State Reformatory in Mansfield. His name is contained in documents found within the cornerstone of the structure. (https://sites.rootsweb.com/~ohrichla/POP/Bus2/FFS.htm)

Astronauts
Michael L. Gernhardt, astronaut

Athletics

Ernie Beam, former baseball player
Hugh Douglas, Philadelphia Eagles defensive end
Pete Henry, professional football player
Mary Holda, All-American Girls Professional Baseball League player
Dick Logan, professional football player
Terry McDaniel, professional football player for the Oakland Raiders and the Seattle Seahawks
Ricky Minard, professional basketball player
Don Nehlen, former head football coach
Bill Peterson, former head football coach at Florida State, Mansfield Senior High, Rice University, and with the Houston Oilers
Ryan Pore, professional soccer player, Major League Soccer, Kansas City Wizards
Marc Wilkins, former Major League Baseball player
Natalie Hershberger (taekwondo), six-time National Olympic-style Taekwondo Champion
Jamie Feick, former NBA player

Authors and writers

Jacob Brinkerhoff, jurist, congressman, and author
Roeliff Brinkerhoff, lawyer; editor and owner of the Mansfield Herald; later a bank president
Louis Bromfield, Pulitzer Prize-winning author
Stacy Dittrich, true crime author and mystery novelist
Terry Hertzler, poet and writer
Mary Bigelow Ingham, educator, writer, social reformer
Christopher Moore, author
Natalie Hershberger, author

Entertainment

Lee Adams, stage lyricist
Jenni Barber, actress, The Electric Company
John Bishop, playwright and film writer
James Lapine, playwright and director
Michael McConnohie, voice actor
Sylvia McNair, operatic soprano
Luke Perry, actor (television) Beverly Hills, 90210
Daniel Roemer, film director, screenwriter
Robert F. Simon, actor

Entrepreneurs
Homer Lee, engraver, artist, entrepreneur, founder of Homer Lee Bank Note Company

Military

Matthias W. Day, US Army Medal of Honor recipient
Frank Purdy Lahm, first Army aviator
Mark Matthews, veteran

Musicians and bands
Ohio Express, rock group; Doug Grassel (rhythm guitar), Dale Powers (lead guitar), Dean Kastran (bass), Jim Pfahler (keyboards), and Tim Corwin (drums)
Music Explosion, rock group; James "Jamie" Lyons (singer, percussion), Donald Atkins (guitar), Richard Nesta (guitar), Burton Stahl (bass), Robert Avery (drums); Top Ten hit in 1967, "Little Bit O'Soul"
Switch, Motown R&B/soul group

Politicians

Sherrod Brown, United States Senator, D-Ohio
Jay Goyal, Ohio State Representative, D-Mansfield
William Johnston, U.S. Representative, D-Ohio from 1863 to 1865
Lovana Jones, Illinois State Representative
Winfield S. Kerr, U.S. Representative, R-Ohio from 1895 to 1901
B. F. Langworthy, Minnesota State Representative
Robert Byington Mitchell, Governor of the New Mexico Territory from 1866 to 1869
William Patterson, U.S. Representative from Ohio
Mark Romanchuk, Ohio Senate, R-22nd District

Scientists
Paul Parmalee, zooarchaeologist

Other
Rebecca Gernhardt Cox (born c. 1955), Assistant Secretary of Transportation; Public Liaison Director for President Reagan; Senior Vice President, Continental Airlines
Shawn Grate, serial killer
Rose Knox, née Markward (1857–1950), businesswoman, (Knox Gelatin Factory)
Roy Repp (1882–1934), stunt driver

See also
Mansfield, Ohio

References

Mansfield, Ohio
 
Mansfield, Ohio
Mansfield, Ohio